The Right Kind of Wrong is a 2013 Canadian romantic comedy film directed by Jeremiah Chechik, based on the 1987 novel Sex and Sunsets by Tim Sandlin. Its premiere was in the Gala Presentation section at the 2013 Toronto International Film Festival.

Plot
Leo, a failed writer and recent divorcee, now works as a dishwasher in the restaurant of his friend, Mandeep. His former wife, Julie, has written a blog about Leo entitled "Why You Suck", which has gone on to be published and become a top selling book. Leo also suffers from a crippling fear of heights.

Leo falls in love with Colette when he first sees her about to enter the church on her wedding day. He decides to win her heart, pursuing her despite scorn from his friends and from Colette's new husband, Danny.

Cast
 Ryan Kwanten as Leo Palamino
 Sara Canning as Colette Hart
 Will Sasso as Neil
 Catherine O'Hara as Tess, Colette's mother
 Kristen Hager as Julie Deere, Leo's ex-wife
 Ryan McPartlin as Danny Hart, Colette's husband
 James A. Woods as Troy Cooper
 Barb Mitchell as Angie
 Jennifer Baxter as Jill
 Raoul Bhaneja as Mandeep
 Anna Quick as Chrissy

Reception

Box office
The film received a limited release in theatres in March 2014, earning box office of $2,098.

Critical response
The review aggregation website Rotten Tomatoes reported a 12% approval rating with an average rating of 3.4/10 based on 17 reviews. Metacritic, which uses a weighted average, assigned a score of 30 out of 100 based on 6 reviews, indicating "generally unfavorable reviews".

References

External links
 
 
 The Right Kind of Wrong at Library and Archives Canada

2013 romantic comedy films
2013 films
Canadian romantic comedy films
English-language Canadian films
Films about writers
Films based on American novels
Films directed by Jeremiah S. Chechik
Films scored by Rachel Portman
Films shot in Alberta
Films shot in Los Angeles
2010s English-language films
2010s Canadian films